IEMS may refer to:

Instituto de Educación Media Superior del Distrito Federal, Mexican institute
Integrated Emergency Medical Service